Royoporus is a genus of fungi in the family Polyporaceae. It was circumscribed by mycologist Asit Baran De in 1996 with Royoporus spathulatus as the type species. The genus name honours Indian botanist Anjali Roy, (1930–2017), who worked at Visva-Bharati University in West Bengal.

Species
 Royoporus spatulatus 

Former species;
 R. badius  = Picipes badius
 R. pseudobetulinus  = Favolus pseudobetulinus

References

External links

Polyporaceae
Polyporales genera
Taxa described in 1996